Jessheim Storsenter is a shopping centre located in the centre of Jessheim, Norway. The name roughly translates as 'the torch centre' and it had a sculpture of the Roman goddess Vesta holding a torch that originally was lit by a natural gas flame.   

It was built by Harald Kværner (HK) on the site of his grocery store.  was rebuilt in 1996, and was expanded in 1997 by Tore Kværner who at that point had taken over control of the centre. The new  reopened on 13 November 1997 and had space for 35 shops. 

Olav Thon purchased  in 1998. In 1999 Thon and Kværner initiated a joint operating agreement whereby the two centres would be merged. The combination was known as Jessheim Storsenter, and opened in 2003 after reconstruction that merged the two centres into one large building.   

After several expansions, the latest in 2008, the mall has now 144 stores.

External links
 Official website

Buildings and structures in Viken
Shopping centres in Norway
Tourist attractions in Viken
Ullensaker